Reinhold Bachmann was an Austrian luger who competed in the late 1980s and early 1990s. A natural track luger, he won two bronze medals in the men's doubles event at the FIL European Luge Natural Track Championships (1989, 1993).

References
Natural track European Championships results 1970-2006.

Austrian male lugers
Living people
Year of birth missing (living people)